Nicholas Paul Tropeano (born August 27, 1990) is an American professional baseball pitcher who is currently a free agent. He previously played in Major League Baseball (MLB) for the Houston Astros, Los Angeles Angels, Pittsburgh Pirates, San Francisco Giants, and New York Mets. Tropeano played college baseball for the Stony Brook Seawolves, and was drafted in the fifth round of the 2011 MLB draft by the Astros.

Amateur career
Tropeano attended West Islip High School in West Islip, New York, where he played baseball as a pitcher and American football as a quarterback. He enrolled at Stony Brook University, where he played college baseball for the Stony Brook Seawolves baseball team in the America East Conference. After his freshman season, Tropeano pitched for the Riverhead Tomcats in the Hamptons Collegiate Baseball League, a collegiate summer baseball league, and was named its Most Valuable Player.

In his sophomore season,  Tropeano had an 8–4 win–loss record with a 2.44 earned run average (ERA) and led the conference with 106 strikeouts en route to being named the America East co-Pitcher of the Year and a finalist for Pitcher of the Year by the College Baseball Hall of Fame. He pitched in the Cape Cod Baseball League for the Cotuit Kettleers between his sophomore and junior seasons at Stony Brook. As a junior, Tropeano had a 12–1 win–loss record and a 1.84 ERA en route to a second conference Pitcher of the Year award (becoming the first pitcher to do so).

Professional career

Houston Astros
The Houston Astros drafted Tropeano in the fifth round of the 2011 Major League Baseball draft. After signing with the Astros, he pitched that season with the Tri-City ValleyCats of the Class A-Short Season New York–Penn League. 

In 2012, he pitched for the Lexington Legends of the Class A South Atlantic League (SAL), where he was twice named the SAL pitcher of the week, and the Lancaster JetHawks of the Class A-Advanced California League. Between the two, he was 12–7 with a 3.76 ERA.

He began the 2013 season with the Corpus Christi Hooks of the Class AA Texas League. On August 1, Tropeano struck out Midland RockHounds infielder Vinnie Catricala with one pitch.

Tropeano opened the 2014 season with the Oklahoma City RedHawks of the Class AAA Pacific Coast League (PCL). Tropeano pitched to a 2.09 ERA by mid-June, but missed a month after he experienced forearm soreness in late June. After pitching to a 9–5 record with a 3.03 ERA and 120 strikeouts in  innings, the Astros promoted Tropeano to the major leagues on September 1. His ERA led the PCL. Tropeano made his MLB debut on September 10, recording the win.

Los Angeles Angels
On November 5, 2014, the Astros traded Tropeano and Carlos Perez to the Los Angeles Angels of Anaheim for Hank Conger. Tropeano pitched in 8 games for the Angels, starting 7 of them, and had an ERA of 3.82 in 37 innings. In 2016, after a rash of injuries to their rotation, Tropeano got called up and in 10 starts went 3–2 and at the time had the best ERA of the rotation with a 3.25 ERA before being placed on the disabled list. Despite his success, he was activated and sent down to AAA after the Angels called up Tim Lincecum.

In August 2016, it was revealed that Tropeano underwent Tommy John surgery, ending his 2016 season and all of 2017 as well.

After missing a full season, Tropeano entered the 2018 season competing for a spot in the rotation. He was sent down to AAA to begin the season but after injuries to the Angels rotation, he was called up and made 4 starts before going on the disabled list with elbow inflammation. He was shut down for the season on September 11 after feeling discomfort in his right shoulder. He ended the 2018 season with the Angels making 14 starts, with a record of 5–6 and an ERA of 4.74 and 64 strikeouts in 76 innings. Tropeano elected free agency following the 2019 season.

New York Yankees
Tropeano signed a minor league contract with the New York Yankees for the 2020 season that included a non-roster invitation to spring training. The Yankees promoted him to the major leagues on August 6. However, he never made an appearance for them and was designated for assignment on August 8, 2020.

Pittsburgh Pirates
On August 11, 2020, Tropeano was claimed off waivers by the Pittsburgh Pirates and sent to its alternate training site after Joe Musgrove was placed on the injured list. In his Pirates debut on August 25, Tropeano threw four scoreless innings in relief. Tropeano earned his first win with the Pirates on August 30. Tropeano ended the year with a 1.15 ERA in 15.2 innings pitched, while striking out 19. He set career-highs in strikeout rate and walk rate.

New York Mets
On October 30, 2020, Tropeano was claimed off waivers by the New York Mets. On December 2, Tropeano was non-tendered by the Mets.

San Francisco Giants
On February 16, 2021, Tropeano signed a minor league contract worth $1.1 million with the San Francisco Giants organization that included an invitation to spring training. On May 21, Tropeano was selected to the active roster and he made his Giants' debut the following day in relief against the Dodgers. Tropeano recorded a 1.50 ERA across 4 appearances for the Giants, but was designated for assignment on June 4.

New York Mets (second stint)
On June 11, 2021, Tropeano was claimed off waivers by the New York Mets and assigned to the Triple-A Syracuse Mets. After splitting time between Syracuse and New York, where he gave up 1 run in 2 innings pitched, Tropeano was designated for assignment on July 30. On August 2, Tropeano elected free agency

Los Angeles Dodgers
On August 6, 2021, Tropeano signed a minor league contract with the Los Angeles Dodgers. He pitched in nine games (five starts) for the Triple-A Oklahoma City Dodgers and was 1–0 with a 4.91 ERA.

Texas Rangers
On January 26, 2022, Tropeano signed a minor league contract with the Texas Rangers. He opted out of his deal and became a free agent on June 1, 2022.

References

External links

Living people
1990 births
People from West Islip, New York
Baseball players from New York (state)
Major League Baseball pitchers
Houston Astros players
Los Angeles Angels players
Pittsburgh Pirates players
San Francisco Giants players
New York Mets players
Stony Brook Seawolves baseball players
Tri-City ValleyCats players
Mesa Solar Sox players
Lexington Legends players
Lancaster JetHawks players
Corpus Christi Hooks players
Oklahoma City RedHawks players
Salt Lake Bees players
Cotuit Kettleers players
Oklahoma City Dodgers players
Syracuse Mets players
Round Rock Express players